Károly Czanik (born 13 September 1984) is a Slovak football midfielder of Hungarian ethnicity who currently plays for Gyirmót SE.

References

1984 births
Living people
Sportspeople from Komárno
Hungarian footballers
Slovak footballers
Slovak expatriate footballers
Expatriate footballers in Hungary
Association football midfielders
Slovak expatriate sportspeople in Hungary
Győri ETO FC players
Integrál-DAC footballers
Debreceni VSC players
Nyíregyháza Spartacus FC players
Hungarian people of Slovak descent
Szolnoki MÁV FC footballers